List of radio stations in the Upper East region of Ghana in no particular order

See also
Media of Ghana
 List of newspapers in Ghana
 List of radio stations in Ghana
Telecommunications in Ghana
New Media in Ghana

References 

Upper East